Eutropis is a genus of skinks belonging to the subfamily Mabuyinae. For long, this genus was included in the "wastebin taxon" Mabuya; it contains the Asian mabuyas. They often share their habitat with the related common skinks (Sphenomorphus), but they do not compete significantly as their ecological niches differ. This genus also contains the only member of the subfamily to occur in Australasia, the many-lined sun skink (Eutropis multifasciata), whose wide range includes New Guinea.

Description
They are mid-sized to largish lizards with cylindrical bodies, tails of medium length, and well-developed arms and legs; the hands and feet have 5 toes each. Their cycloid scales are underlaid by osteoderms; the scales on the back and belly are similar in shape, but those on the back are keeled. The scales on the top of the head are generally flat and subimbricate; they have a pair of supranasal scales and the frontoparietal and prefrontal scales are paired or fused. The second supraocular scale is the hindmost one that contacts the frontal scale, and the tertiary temporal scale extends forward to separate the secondary temporal scales. The nasal scale is undivided.

Eutropis mabuyas have 26 presacral vertebrae. Their palatine bones are in contact with the median; the deep sphenopalatine notch separates the pterygoids and extends forwards to between the centre of the eyes. The fairly small teeth are pleurodont, and the pterygopid always bears teeth. The ear opening is small, and the eardrums are hidden in a moderately deep ear canal.

Species
Eutropis includes the following species:
Eutropis alcalai 
Eutropis allapallensis  – Allapalli grass skink, Schmidt's mabuya
Eutropis andamanensis  – Andaman Islands grass skink 
Eutropis ashwamedhi  – Ashwamedh writhing skink, Ashwamedha supple skink
Eutropis austini 
Eutropis beddomei  – Beddome's mabuya
Eutropis bibronii  – Bibron's skink, seashore skink
Eutropis bontocensis  – Luzon montane mabuya
Eutropis borealis 
Eutropis brevis 
Eutropis caraga  – Caraga sun skink 
Eutropis carinata  – keeled Indian mabuya, many-keeled grass skink, "golden skink"
Eutropis chapaensis  – Sapa mabuya 
Eutropis clivicola  – Inger's mabuya
Eutropis cumingi  – Cuming's mabuya, Cuming's eared skink
Eutropis cuprea  – copper sun skink
Eutropis darevskii  – Darevsky's mabouya, Darevsky's mabuya, Darevsky's skink 
Eutropis dattaroyi 
Eutropis dawsoni  – Gans's grass skink 
Eutropis englei  – six-striped mabuya
Eutropis floweri  – Taylor's striped mabuya
Eutropis greeri 
Eutropis gubataas  – upland sun skink
Eutropis indeprensa  – Brown's mabuya
Eutropis innotata  – Blanford's mabuya
Eutropis islamaliit  – striking Philippine sun skink
Eutropis lankae 
Eutropis lapulapu  – Lapu-lapu’s sun skink
Eutropis lewisi  – Lewis’s mabuya
Eutropis longicaudata  – longtail mabuya, long-tailed sun skink
Eutropis macrophthalma 
Eutropis macularia  – bronze mabuya, bronze grass skink
Eutropis madaraszi  – Sri Lanka bronze mabuya
Eutropis multicarinata 
Eutropis multifasciata  – East Indian brown mabuya, many-lined sun skink, many-striped skink, common sun skink, golden skink
Eutropis nagarjuni  – Sharma's mabuya
Eutropis palauensis  – Palau sun skink
Eutropis quadratilobus 
Eutropis quadricarinata  – beautiful mabuya
Eutropis resetarii 
Eutropis rudis  – rough mabuya, brown mabuya
Eutropis rugifera  – Nicobar Island skink, Sulawesi bronze bush skink
Eutropis sahulinghangganan  – Palawan sun skink
Eutropis sibalom  – Sibalom sun skink
Eutropis tammanna  – Tammanna skink
Eutropis trivittata  – three-banded mabuya
Eutropis tytleri  – Tytler's mabuya
Eutropis vertebralis  

Nota bene: A binomial authority in parentheses indicates that the species was originally described in a genus other than Eutropis.

References

Further reading
Fitzinger L (1843). Systema Reptilium, Fasciculus Primus, Amblyglossae. Vienna: Braumüller & Seidel. 106 pp. + indices. (Genus Eutropis, p. 22). (in Latin).

 
Lygosominae
Lizard genera
Taxa named by Leopold Fitzinger